Carolina Portesi Peroni (born 11 May 2001) is an Italian ice dancer. With her skating partner, Michael Chrastecky, she is the 2023 Italian national bronze medalist, a two-time Italian junior national champion (2020–21) and competed in the final segment at the 2020 World Junior Championships.

Personal life 
Portesi Peroni was born on 11 May 2001, in Brescia, Italy, to Michela Peroni and Nicola Portesi. She has an older sister named Camilla.

Career

Early career 
Portesi Peroni competed for two seasons with Alessio Galli before forming a partnership with Czech-Slovene dancer Michael Chrastecky to represent her country.

Portesi Peroni/Chrastecky made their Junior Grand Prix debut at the 2017 JGP Italy, where they placed tenth. They did not return to the Junior Grand Prix the following season, competing instead at several minor, junior internationals and winning the bronze medal at the Italian championships.

2019–20 season 
Returning to the Junior Grand Prix, Portesi Peroni/Chrastecky placed seventh at 2019 JGP France and ninth at 2019 JGP Croatia. They won a bronze medal at the junior competition at Golden Spin and then took the gold at the Italian junior nationals for the first time.  They concluded the season making their debut at the World Junior Championships, where they finished in seventeenth position.

2020–21 season 
With the coronavirus pandemic causing the cancellation of the international junior season, Portesi Peroni/Chrastecky won their second consecutive Italian junior title.

2021–22 season 
Making their international senior debut on the Challenger series, Portesi Peroni/Chrastecky placed eleventh on the 2021 CS Lombardia Trophy.  They next competed at the 2021 CS Nebelhorn Trophy, seeking to qualify a second spot for Italy at the 2022 Winter Olympics. They placed eighth, making Italy the third reserve.

On October 6, Portesi Peroni announced on her Instagram that she had ruptured her patellar tendon, requiring surgery and four months of recovery, ending their season.

They were named to the host spot at the 2021 Gran Premio d'Italia but later withdrew due to their injury.

Programs 
 With Chrastecky

Competitive highlights 
GP: Grand Prix; CS: Challenger Series; JGP: Junior Grand Prix

With Chrastecky

With Galli

Detailed results 
ISU Personal best highlighted in bold.

 With Chrastecky

Senior-level results

Junior-level results

References

External links 
 
 
 

2001 births
Living people
Italian female ice dancers
Sportspeople from Brescia
21st-century Italian women